is a passenger railway station in located in the city of  Daitō, Osaka Prefecture, Japan, operated by West Japan Railway Company (JR West).

Lines

Station layout
The station has two opposed ground-level side platforms with an elevated station. The station is staffed.

Platforms

Adjacent stations

History
The station was opened on 15 May 1899. 

Station numbering was introduced in March 2018 with Nozaki being assigned station number JR-H35.

Passenger statistics
In fiscal 2019, the station was used by an average of 11,074 passengers daily (boarding passengers only).

Surrounding area
 Nozaki Kannon (Jigen-ji)
Iimoriyama Castle
Osaka Sangyo University
Osaka Sangyo University Junior College
Osaka Toin Junior and Senior High School
Osaka Prefectural Nozaki High School

References

External links

Official home page 

Railway stations in Japan opened in 1899
Railway stations in Osaka Prefecture
Daitō, Osaka